Mossy Head is an unincorporated community in Walton County, Florida, located at the intersection of U.S. Highway 90 and County Road 1087,  east of the north end of State Road 285. It is at the head of Mossy Head Branch, a tributary of the Shoal River.  The ZIP Code for Mossy Head is 32434.

In 1951, Mossy Head became the interchange point for a base railroad constructed between the Louisville and Nashville Railroad and Eglin Air Force Base, located partially in Walton County. The line operated until the early 1980s, and a short section on the north end of the alignment still exists for rail shipments.

References

Unincorporated communities in Walton County, Florida